The Hague Hijacking Convention (formally the Convention for the Suppression of Unlawful Seizure of Aircraft) is a multilateral treaty by which states agree to prohibit and punish aircraft hijacking. The convention does not apply to customs, law enforcement or military aircraft, thus it applies exclusively to civilian aircraft. The convention only addresses situations in which an aircraft takes off or lands in a place different from its country of registration. The convention sets out the principle of aut dedere aut judicare—that a party to the treaty must prosecute an aircraft hijacker if no other state requests his or her extradition for prosecution of the same crime.

Creation and entry into force
The convention was adopted by the International Conference on Air Law at The Hague on 16 December 1970. It came into force on 14 October 1971 after it had been ratified by 10 states. As of 2013, the convention has 185 state parties.

State parties
The convention has 185 state parties, which includes 183 UN members plus the Cook Islands and Niue. The 10 UN member states that are not parties to the treaty are:

Of these 10 states, the convention has been signed but not ratified by Burundi.

Former state parties and successions
Former state parties that were not formally succeeded by any existing state include Czechoslovakia, East Germany, South Vietnam, and Yugoslavia. A number of states ratified but have since been succeeded by new states: Serbia ratified as the Federal Republic of Yugoslavia; Russia ratified as the Soviet Union; Belarus ratified as the Byelorussian SSR; and Ukraine ratified as the Ukrainian SSR. Prior to the unification of Yemen, both North and South Yemen had ratified the convention. The Republic of China signed and ratified the agreement; in 1980, the People's Republic of China approved the treaty with a statement that it declared the Republic of China's actions with respect to the convention "null and void".

2010 Protocol
In 2010 in Beijing, the Protocol Supplementary to the Convention for the Suppression of Unlawful Seizure of Aircraft was adopted. The Protocol makes amendments and additions to the original convention. As September 2018, the Protocol has been ratified by 27 states. It entered into force on 1 January 2018.

See also
Tokyo Convention
Convention for the Suppression of Unlawful Acts against the Safety of Maritime Navigation
Beijing Convention
LOT Flight 165 hijacking#Trial

External links
Text.
Ratifications.
2010 Protocol.
2010 Protocol ratifications.

Treaties concluded in 1970
Treaties entered into force in 1971
1970 in aviation
1970 in the Netherlands
Aircraft hijacking
International Civil Aviation Organization treaties
International criminal law treaties
Terrorism treaties
Treaties of the Democratic Republic of Afghanistan
Treaties of Albania
Treaties of Algeria
Treaties of Andorra
Treaties of Angola
Treaties of Antigua and Barbuda
Treaties of Argentina
Treaties of Armenia
Treaties of Australia
Treaties of Austria
Treaties of Azerbaijan
Treaties of the Bahamas
Treaties of Bahrain
Treaties of Bangladesh
Treaties of Barbados
Treaties of the Byelorussian Soviet Socialist Republic
Treaties of Belgium
Treaties of Belize
Treaties of the Republic of Dahomey
Treaties of Bhutan
Treaties of Bolivia
Treaties of Bosnia and Herzegovina
Treaties of Botswana
Treaties of the military dictatorship in Brazil
Treaties of Brunei
Treaties of the People's Republic of Bulgaria
Treaties of Burkina Faso
Treaties of Cambodia
Treaties of Cameroon
Treaties of Canada
Treaties of Cape Verde
Treaties of the Central African Republic
Treaties of Chad
Treaties of Chile
Treaties of the Republic of China (1949–1971)
Treaties of the People's Republic of China
Treaties of Colombia
Treaties of the Comoros
Treaties of the Republic of the Congo
Treaties of the Cook Islands
Treaties of Costa Rica
Treaties of Ivory Coast
Treaties of Croatia
Treaties of Cuba
Treaties of Cyprus
Treaties of the Czech Republic
Treaties of Czechoslovakia
Treaties of North Korea
Treaties of Zaire
Treaties of Denmark
Treaties of Djibouti
Treaties of Dominica
Treaties of the Dominican Republic
Treaties of Ecuador
Treaties of Egypt
Treaties of El Salvador
Treaties of Equatorial Guinea
Treaties of Estonia
Treaties of the Derg
Treaties of Fiji
Treaties of Finland
Treaties of France
Treaties of Gabon
Treaties of the Gambia
Treaties of Georgia (country)
Treaties of East Germany
Treaties of West Germany
Treaties of Ghana
Treaties of the Kingdom of Greece
Treaties of Grenada
Treaties of Guatemala
Treaties of Guinea
Treaties of Guinea-Bissau
Treaties of Guyana
Treaties of Haiti
Treaties of Honduras
Treaties of the Hungarian People's Republic
Treaties of Iceland
Treaties of India
Treaties of Indonesia
Treaties of Pahlavi Iran
Treaties of Ba'athist Iraq
Treaties of Ireland
Treaties of Israel
Treaties of Italy
Treaties of Jamaica
Treaties of Japan
Treaties of Jordan
Treaties of Kazakhstan
Treaties of Kenya
Treaties of Kuwait
Treaties of Kyrgyzstan
Treaties of Laos
Treaties of Latvia
Treaties of Lebanon
Treaties of Lesotho
Treaties of Liberia
Treaties of the Libyan Arab Jamahiriya
Treaties of Liechtenstein
Treaties of Lithuania
Treaties of Luxembourg
Treaties of Madagascar
Treaties of Malawi
Treaties of Malaysia
Treaties of the Maldives
Treaties of Mali
Treaties of Malta
Treaties of the Marshall Islands
Treaties of Mauritania
Treaties of Mauritius
Treaties of Mexico
Treaties of Monaco
Treaties of the Mongolian People's Republic
Treaties of Montenegro
Treaties of Morocco
Treaties of Mozambique
Treaties of Myanmar
Treaties of Namibia
Treaties of Nauru
Treaties of Nepal
Treaties of the Netherlands
Treaties of New Zealand
Treaties of Nicaragua
Treaties of Niger
Treaties of Nigeria
Treaties of Niue
Treaties of Norway
Treaties of Oman
Treaties of Pakistan
Treaties of Palau
Treaties of Panama
Treaties of Papua New Guinea
Treaties of Paraguay
Treaties of Peru
Treaties of the Philippines
Treaties of the Polish People's Republic
Treaties of Portugal
Treaties of Qatar
Treaties of South Korea
Treaties of Moldova
Treaties of the Socialist Republic of Romania
Treaties of the Soviet Union
Treaties of Rwanda
Treaties of Samoa
Treaties of São Tomé and Príncipe
Treaties of Saudi Arabia
Treaties of Senegal
Treaties of Serbia and Montenegro
Treaties of Seychelles
Treaties of Sierra Leone
Treaties of Singapore
Treaties of Slovakia
Treaties of Slovenia
Treaties of South Africa
Treaties of Spain
Treaties of Sri Lanka
Treaties of Saint Kitts and Nevis
Treaties of Saint Lucia
Treaties of Saint Vincent and the Grenadines
Treaties of the Democratic Republic of the Sudan
Treaties of Suriname
Treaties of Eswatini
Treaties of Sweden
Treaties of Switzerland
Treaties of Syria
Treaties of Tajikistan
Treaties of Thailand
Treaties of North Macedonia
Treaties of Togo
Treaties of Tonga
Treaties of Trinidad and Tobago
Treaties of Tunisia
Treaties of Turkey
Treaties of Turkmenistan
Treaties of Uganda
Treaties of the Ukrainian Soviet Socialist Republic
Treaties of the United Arab Emirates
Treaties of the United Kingdom
Treaties of Tanzania
Treaties of the United States
Treaties of Uruguay
Treaties of Uzbekistan
Treaties of Vanuatu
Treaties of Venezuela
Treaties of Vietnam
Treaties of South Vietnam
Treaties of the Yemen Arab Republic
Treaties of South Yemen
Treaties of Yugoslavia
Treaties of Zambia
Treaties of Zimbabwe
Treaties extended to Greenland
Treaties extended to the Netherlands Antilles
Treaties extended to Aruba
Treaties extended to Akrotiri and Dhekelia
Treaties extended to Saint Christopher-Nevis-Anguilla
Treaties extended to Bermuda
Treaties extended to the British Antarctic Territory
Treaties extended to the British Indian Ocean Territory
Treaties extended to the British Virgin Islands
Treaties extended to the Cayman Islands
Treaties extended to the Falkland Islands
Treaties extended to Gibraltar
Treaties extended to Guernsey
Treaties extended to the Isle of Man
Treaties extended to Jersey
Treaties extended to Montserrat
Treaties extended to the Pitcairn Islands
Treaties extended to Saint Helena, Ascension and Tristan da Cunha
Treaties extended to South Georgia and the South Sandwich Islands
Treaties extended to the Turks and Caicos Islands
Treaties extended to the Colony of the Bahamas
Treaties extended to British Antigua and Barbuda
Treaties extended to British Dominica
Treaties extended to British Grenada
Treaties extended to British Honduras
Treaties extended to British Saint Lucia
Treaties extended to British Saint Vincent and the Grenadines
Treaties extended to the British Solomon Islands
Treaties extended to Brunei (protectorate)
Treaties extended to the Gilbert and Ellice Islands
Treaties extended to the New Hebrides
Treaties extended to the Crown Colony of Seychelles
Treaties extended to Portuguese Macau
20th century in The Hague